The 1998 Dura Lube/Kmart 500 was the 31st stock car race of the 1998 NASCAR Winston Cup Series season and the 11th iteration of the event. The race was held on Sunday, October 25, 1998, in Avondale, Arizona at Phoenix International Raceway, a 1-mile (1.6 km) permanent low-banked tri-oval race track. The race was shortened from its scheduled 312 laps to 257 laps due to inclement weather. At race's end, Penske-Kranefuss Racing driver Rusty Wallace would dominate the race when the race was stopped to take his 48th career NASCAR Winston Cup Series victory and his only victory of the season. To fill out the podium, Roush Racing driver Mark Martin and Richard Childress Racing driver Dale Earnhardt would finish second and third, respectively.

Background 

Phoenix International Raceway – also known as PIR – is a one-mile, low-banked tri-oval race track located in Avondale, Arizona. It is named after the nearby metropolitan area of Phoenix. The motorsport track opened in 1964 and currently hosts two NASCAR race weekends annually. PIR has also hosted the IndyCar Series, CART, USAC and the Rolex Sports Car Series. The raceway is currently owned and operated by International Speedway Corporation.

The raceway was originally constructed with a 2.5 mi (4.0 km) road course that ran both inside and outside of the main tri-oval. In 1991 the track was reconfigured with the current 1.51 mi (2.43 km) interior layout. PIR has an estimated grandstand seating capacity of around 67,000. Lights were installed around the track in 2004 following the addition of a second annual NASCAR race weekend.

Entry list 

 (R) denotes rookie driver.

Practice

First practice 
The first practice session was held on Friday, October 23, at 1:30 PM EST. The session would last for one hour and 25 minutes.

Second practice 
The second practice session was held on Friday, October 23, at 3:35 PM EST. The session would last for 45 minutes.

Final practice 
The final practice session, sometimes referred to as Happy Hour, was held on Saturday, October 24, after the preliminary 1998 GM Goodwrench Service/AC Delco 300. The session would last for one hour.

Qualifying 
Qualifying was split into two rounds. The first round was held on Friday, October 23, at 5:15 PM EST. Each driver would have one lap to set a time. During the first round, the top 25 drivers in the round would be guaranteed a starting spot in the race. If a driver was not able to guarantee a spot in the first round, they had the option to scrub their time from the first round and try and run a faster lap time in a second round qualifying run, held on Saturday, October 24, at 2:00 PM EST. As with the first round, each driver would have one lap to set a time. On January 24, 1998, NASCAR would announce that the amount of provisionals given would be increased from last season. Positions 26-36 would be decided on time, while positions 37-43 would be based on provisionals. Six spots are awarded by the use of provisionals based on owner's points. The seventh is awarded to a past champion who has not otherwise qualified for the race. If no past champion needs the provisional, the next team in the owner points will be awarded a provisional.

Three drivers would fail to qualify: Dave Marcis, Michael Waltrip, and Jeff Ward.

Full qualifying results 

*Time not available.

Race results

References 

1998 NASCAR Winston Cup Series
NASCAR races at Phoenix Raceway
October 1998 sports events in the United States
1998 in sports in Arizona